Generation P is an independent Russian film, written and directed by Victor Ginzburg and based on Victor Pelevin’s 1999 novel of the same name. It received universal acclaim from critics.

Plot 
"Generation P" follows the strange adventures of Babylen Tatarsky as he evolves from a disillusioned young man in the drab days of post-communist Moscow to the chief “creative” behind the virtual world of Russian politics.

When Babylen was a Young Pioneer, his generation received a gift from the decaying Soviet state in the form of a bottle of Pepsi, of Russian manufacture. Not just a beverage, it was also a symbol of hope that someday, a new, magical life would arrive from the other side of the ocean. The arrival of this life, and the way it transformed these ex-Pioneers, is what the film is about. In the early Nineties, Tatarsky, a frustrated poet, takes a job as an advertising copywriter, and discovers a knack for putting a distinctively Russian twist on Western-style ads. But the deeper Tatarsky sinks into the advertising world, the more he wonders if he has sacrificed too much for money. His soaring success leads him into a surreal world of spin doctors, gangsters, drug trips, and the spirit of Che Guevara who, via a Ouija Board, imparts to him the dazzling theory of WOWism, about how television destroys the individual spirit. Though named in honor of Lenin, Babylen opts instead to believe in his “Babylonian” destiny, and secretly searches for the beautiful goddess Ishtar, who becomes for him a symbol of fortune. Meanwhile, the people around Babylen - clients, colleagues - perish in the violent dog-eat-dog world of new Russian capitalism. In Nineties Moscow, this is taken as the ordinary course of daily affairs. Tatarsky is invited to join an all-powerful PR firm run by a cynically ruthless advertising genius, Leonid Azadovsky, who invites Tatarsky to participate in a secret process of rigged elections and false political advertising. And as a result of his brilliance, Tatarsky achieves the ultimate, as he creates and gets elected a "virtual" president. But like Faust selling his soul to the devil, this ex-humanist gradually descends to the level of a reprobate, finding that he no longer belongs to himself, but is trapped in a virtual world of his own creation. Babylen returns to his Buddhist friend Gireyev and takes hallucinogenic mushrooms, in attempt to re-create his previous experience. In a ritualistic Sumerian initiation, Babylen replaces Azadovsky as head of the Agency and becomes the earthly husband of Goddess Ishtar, the object of his obsession. There, he is offered control of the mechanism that produces “simple human happiness” - and can control the world.

Themes

Generation P explores the philosophical theme of man’s identity in the modern branded world, and that’s the substance of the film - but not its tone. Babylen Tatarsky's story is also a hallucinatory fun ride, a quest for gold, of how to make it in today¹s world, of the head-spinning rise to power, and of the fall from grace. Ginzburg said, "I was interested in seeing the border between real and virtual in Babylen's world gradually disappear, ultimately bringing the viewer to a place I hope they will recognize as the world we all live in today." The film makes no compromises with the political absurdities of modern Russia and how the Nineties set the stage for the Putin era and the emergence of the Russian corporate state, with its control of mass media, and virtual politicians that get elected.

Production

Filming
In 2006 Ginzburg dedicated himself to the writing and directing of Generation P and soon discovered the reluctance on the part of the Russian film industry to finance such an expensive non-genre film. Applications for government subsidy, that the majority of Russian films receive, were rejected. Television networks were skeptical. Although the movie was completed and released under the auspices of the Gorky Film Studio, Ginzburg was forced to finance the film independently and raise $7 million, which accounts for it taking five years (2006–11) to reach theaters. In the process, the production ran out of money three times, including the financial crisis of 2008. It was at the "rough cut" stage that the film was seen by Konstantin Ernst from Channel One, who immediately made decision to buy the TV premiere. A surprise hit of the spring and summer of 2011, Victor Ginzburg’s Generation P has proven wrong those who thought Pelevin’s 1999 seminal novel about the rise of the advertising industry in Post-Soviet Russia was simply unfilmable.

Cinematography
Ginzburg chose Aleksei Rodionov as cinematographer, whose work ranges from the classic war epic Come and See to the adaptation of Virginia Woolf's famous novel Orlando. Rodionov was nominated for a number of prestigious Russian awards for his work on Generation P

Musical score
Ginzburg chose composers Kaveh Cohen, Michael Nielson and composer/musician Alexander Hacke to write original music for the movie. Sergey Shnurov a legendary Russian punk rock musician who played Buddhist monk Gireev also contributed to the film's soundtrack.

Russian Release
The Russian film industry avoids provocative political and social issues because it's financed by the government and state-owned TV networks. Generation P poked sharp satire at the current Russian political system and the virtuality of its leaders. There was real fear on the part of the distributor "Karo", that Generation P will not be granted the "distribution license" due to foul language and politics, including scenes with "banned" oligarch Berezovsky and scenes of Putin-like virtual president. But after four years in stop and go independent production, over a million views of the film's trailers on YouTube and much press, the buzz was so strong - the Facebook group alone generated over 40 thousand followers, mostly progressive Russians - that nobody could stop the release. Generation P was released in Russia, Ukraine and Kazakhstan on April 14, 2011. It was #3 in the Russian Box Office after the first weekend with a total of $2,094,414 (Russia)on 527 screens. The film went on to gross about $4.7M in CIS and became the highest grossing Russian film of spring-summer 2011.

Marketing
The film received partial financing and marketing support from some of the major brands that appear in it, without which this story would be impossible to tell. Ginzburg was able to get the freedom to integrate selected brands organically into the story, without the dreaded restrictions, associated with "product placement". The film's irreverent storytelling demanded unabashed satire and humor, but the historic placement and tremendous PR values compensated the risks. Both Coca-Cola and PepsiCo participated, since both had historical roles to play in epic story of the new Russia. Other brands included Snickers, American Express, Tic-Tac, Smirnoff, Range Rover, Panasonic, Nokia and Apple. Leading Russian search engine Yandex and mobile provider Megafon also played roles and contributed greatly to both the budget and the promotion of the film. Facebook has recently entered the Russian market and contributed a sizable budget to the promotion of the film in order to connect with the progressive audience in Russia. The brand cross-promo marketing value of Generation P was estimated at $2.5M and compensated greatly for marginal advertising by the distributor.

Critical reception
Generation P received critical acclaim at the 2011 Toronto International Film Festival where it played in the Vanguard Program; at 2012 New Directors/New Films at MoMA and Lincoln Center in New York; nominated for New Voices/New Visions Grand Jury Prize at the 2012 Palm Springs International Film Festival. Other accolades include Special Jury Mention at the 2011 Karlovy Vary International Film Festival; Special Jury Prize at the 2012 Sofia International Film Festival; Best Feature Film Debut at the 2012 Almata International Film Festival; and the Audience Award at the 2011 “Sputnik Over Poland”, the biggest festival of Russian cinema outside of Russia. Generation P was the Opening Film of the 2011 London Russian Film Festival and received the "Time Out London" Critics’ Choice of the Week.

Cast 

 Vladimir Epifantsev as Babilen Tatarsky
 Mikhail Yefremov as Leonid (Legion) Azadovsky
 Andrei Fomin as Sergei Morkovin
 Vladimir Menshov as Farsuk Farseykin
 Alexander Gordon as Hanin
 Oleg Taktarov as Vovchik
 Renata Litvinova as Alla
 Andrei Panin as Kolya the driver/ Nikolai Smirnov
 Sergey Shnurov as Gireyev
 Leonid Parfyonov as TV journalist
 Amaliya Goldanskaya as Lena
 Andrei Vasiliev as Azadovsky's advisor
 Roman Trakhtenberg as Sasha Blo
 Ivan Okhlobystin as Malyuta
 Elena Polyakova
 Marianna Maksimovskaya
 Igor Grigoriev
 Yulia Bordovskih
 Igor Mirkurbanov as Dima Pugin
 Yuriy Safarov as Gussein

Reviews

Generation P has an approval rating of 75% on review aggregator website Rotten Tomatoes, based on 12 reviews, and an average rating of 6.60/10. On Metacritic, the film has a weighted average score of 65 out of 100, based on 7 critics, indicating "generally favorable reviews".

Huffington Post: “This is the 2001: A Space Odyssey for our time." 
“Virtually indescribable, visually awe-inspiring and philosophically rich, Generation P is a magnificent, surreal social satire… exhibits a stylistic genius equal to a Gilliam or Fincher in the process.”

Wall Street Journal: "...One of the year's true cinematic sleepers...a cultural firebomb."

New York Times: “... brave, head-spinning commentary on the potency of advertising and the seduction of the soul... a delirious celebration of sloganeering and spin.”

Chicago Sun-Times: “...a cross between "Mad Men" and an acid trip. …a daring, transgressive satire...” Roger Ebert

Indiewire: “...two ferociously entertaining hours… "Generation P" is a journey to the rotten, violent, media/ power center of a country whose struggle to define its identity is corroded into a sinister advertising campaign.”

Time Out NY: “…a keyhole into the future of the entire world.”

The Hindu: “...a glorious, stimulating film that boasts some terrific, provocative imagery and splendid acting... guilty pleasure bursting with dark, outrageous material.”

Slant Magazine: “...a frenzied essayistic quality, like Jean-Luc Godard on acid.”

Variety: “A virtuoso "Brazil"-like look at what followed after capitalism won the Cold War.”

The Village Voice: "Director Victor Ginzburg's Generation P gives phantasmagoric treatment to an alternate (but not necessarily inaccurate) history of the Putin moment."

See also
Victor Ginzburg
Generation "П"

References

External links 
 
Generation P - a hallucinatory look at Russia's post–Cold War quarrel with capitalism
Generation P, or from Russia with cynicism
 Director: «Generation П» — Truly independent film (interview with Victor Ginzburg in BBC Russian) 
 Экранизация П (журнал «Коммерсантъ Деньги») 

2011 films
2010s Russian-language films
2011 independent films
2011 black comedy films
2010s science fiction comedy-drama films
Russian independent films
Russian black comedy films
Russian science fiction comedy-drama films
Films set in Moscow
Films set in Russia
Films about advertising
Films based on Russian novels